Ruth Downie (born 18 April 1955, North Devon, United Kingdom) is a British author.  She is best known for her mysteries featuring the “reluctant sleuth”,  Gaius Petreius Ruso, that are set in the Roman world.

Bibliography
Ruso and the Disappearing Dancing Girls (2006), published as Medicus in the United States
Ruso and the Demented Doctor (2008), published as Terra Incognita in the United States
Ruso and the Root of all Evils (2009), published as Persona Non Grata in the United States
Ruso and the River of Darkness (2010), published as Caveat Emptor in the United States
Semper Fidelis (2013)
Tabula Rasa (2014)
Vita Brevis (2016)
Memento Mori (2018)
Prima Facie (2019)

References

External links

1955 births
Living people
20th-century British novelists
20th-century English women writers
British detective fiction writers
English crime fiction writers
English women novelists
English mystery writers
Women mystery writers
Writers of historical fiction set in antiquity
Writers of historical mysteries